Love with the Proper Stranger is a 1963 American romantic comedy-drama film made by Pakula-Mulligan Productions and Boardwalk Productions and released by Paramount Pictures.  It was directed by Robert Mulligan and produced by Alan J. Pakula from a screenplay by Arnold Schulman.

The film stars Natalie Wood, Steve McQueen, Edie Adams, Herschel Bernardi and Harvey Lembeck. The film also marked the screen debut of Tom Bosley and features a brief, uncredited appearance by the director's younger brother Richard Mulligan, who later became a well-known television actor. The film received five Academy Award nominations including Best Actress (for Wood).

The film addresses themes of abortion, norms of conventional marriage and adulthood.

Plot
The film tells the story of first generation Italian, Angie Rossini (Natalie Wood), a salesclerk at Macy's department store who finds herself pregnant after a one-night stand with part-time musician Rocky Papasano (Steve McQueen). When she confronts him at mass audition at Carnegie Hall he claims to not remember her. Her only ask is that Rocky fund and find the name of a doctor that is willing to perform abortion. Meanwhile, Angie is being pressured by her working-class older brothers, played by Herschel Bernardi and Harvey Lembeck, to marry the unappealing but successful restaurateur Anthony (Tom Bosley). 

Rocky and Angie scrape up enough money for the abortion but are confronted by Angie's brothers who chase them in the neighborhood. Rocky is able to sneak into a friend's warehouse where the two discuss life, their mistakes and future prospects in life.  When he and Angie meet the crude abortion care provider in a dubious part of the New York City Meatpacking District (who turns out not to be a doctor but a back-room abortionist), Rocky refuses to let her go through with the dangerous procedure much to the relief of Angie, who rests from the trauma in Rocky's old girlfriend's apartment. The maturity he shows in doing this brings them closer and Angie grows to respect him. After meeting her brothers, Rocky (who was given the requisite black eye by the oldest brother) decides to "take his medicine" by agreeing to marry her. Angie, who has more romantic aspirations in life, is insulted by the insinuation of marry by duty and refuses. Angie wants romance, with "bells and banjos".

As an act of independence, Angie moves out of her family home much to the chagrin of her immigrant mother. She begins dating the restauranteur, Anthony, who offers to marry her (and claim the baby as his own.) By acting aloof, she confuses and attracts Rocky back to Macy's where he inquires about her condition. When Rocky, once again discusses marriage, she invites to him to "just come over for dinner" at her apartment instead. The dinner is structured as a "date night" with a well-prepared meal and cocktails. Rocky is impressed with her ability as a homemaker, but even more impressed by her well-dressed and sexy appearance. After 2 stiff drinks, he makes crude advances on her and is rejected yet again. Angie says she does not want to make the same mistake again citing that she is expecting "bells and banjos" in her relationships and that after all the time spent together she actually "likes him." They quarrel and the sobbing Angie throws him out of the apartment and slams the door. The next day, Rocky waits for her outside the crowded Macy's with the sign, "Better Wed than Dead", ringing bells and playing a banjo, and wins her heart.

Cast
 Natalie Wood as Angie Rossini
 Steve McQueen as Rocky Papasano
 Edie Adams as Barbie
 Herschel Bernardi as Dominick Rossini
 Harvey Lembeck as Julio Rossini
 Penny Santon as Mama Rossini
 Virginia Vincent as Anna
 Marilyn Chris as Gina
and introducing
 Tom Bosley as Anthony Columbo
 Richard S. Castellano as Extra

Accolades

Also, the film is recognized by American Film Institute in these lists:
 2002: AFI's 100 Years...100 Passions – Nominated

See also
List of American films of 1963
1963 in film

References

External links
 

1963 films
1963 comedy-drama films
1963 romantic comedy films
1960s romantic comedy-drama films
American black-and-white films
American pregnancy films
American romantic comedy-drama films
1960s English-language films
Films about abortion
Films directed by Robert Mulligan
Films scored by Elmer Bernstein
Films set in New York City
Paramount Pictures films
1960s American films